Honda CT50 may refer to:

 Honda CT50 Hunter Cub, a small off-road motorbike introduced in 1968.
 Honda CT50 Motra, a minibike introduced in 1982.